The 2009 season in Swedish football, starting January 2009 and ending December 2009:

Events

Honours

Official titles

Competitions

Promotions, relegations and qualifications

Promotions

Relegations

International qualifications

Domestic results

2009 Allsvenskan

2009 Allsvenskan qualification play-off

2009 Superettan

2009 Superettan qualification play-off

2009 Division 1 Norra 
Norra

Södra

2009 Division 1 Södra

2009 Svenska Cupen 

Quarter-finals

Semi-finals

Final

2009 Supercupen 

Final

National team results

Notes

References 
Online

 
Seasons in Swedish football